Cardille is a surname. Notable people with the surname include:

 Bill Cardille (1928–2016), American broadcaster
 Lori Cardille (born 1954), American actress and producer, daughter of Bill

See also
 Cardile
 Cardillo
 Carville (surname)